In knot theory, the three-twist knot is the twist knot with three-half twists. It is listed as the 52 knot in the Alexander-Briggs notation, and is one of two knots with crossing number five, the other being the cinquefoil knot.

Properties
The three-twist knot is a prime knot, and it is invertible but not amphichiral.  Its Alexander polynomial is

its Conway polynomial is

and its Jones polynomial is

Because the Alexander polynomial is not monic, the three-twist knot is not fibered.

The three-twist knot is a hyperbolic knot, with its complement having a volume of approximately 2.82812.

If the fibre of the knot in the initial image of this page were cut at the bottom right of the image, and the ends were pulled apart, it would result in a single-stranded figure-of-nine knot (not the figure-of-nine loop).

Example

References

Double torus knots and links